Rattelsdorf is a municipality with market rights in the Upper Franconian district of Bamberg.

Geography
Rattelsdorf lies in the Upper Franconia-West region. It consists of 13 smaller population centres which are all found within the same area. Among them, Ebing is the second-biggest. What follows is a list of all centres with population figures:

as of May 2005

The community also has 7 traditional rural land units, known in German as Gemarkungen, named Busendorf, Ebing, Höfen b. Rattelsdorf, Medlitz, Mürsbach, Rattelsdorf and Daschendorfer Forst, six of which have the same names as six of the constituent communities (it is traditional for a Gemarkung to be named after a town or village lying nearby).

History
Until Secularization in 1803, The Benedictine Monastery at Michelsberg held sway over Rattelsdorf. Michelsberg was one of the monasteries incorporated into the High Monastery at Bamberg. Since the Reichsdeputationshauptschluss of 1803, the community has belonged to Bavaria. In the course of administrative reform in Bavaria, today’s community came into being under the Gemeindeedikt (“Community Edict”) of 1818. Until 1972, Rattelsdorf belonged to Staffelstein district. The constituent community of Höfen, with Höfenneusig and Freudeneck, as well as Mürsbach, with Zaugendorf and Helfenroth, belonged to Ebern district until 1972, and thereby to Lower Franconia.

Population development
Within municipal limits, 3,413 inhabitants were counted in 1970, 3,987 in 1987 and 4,566 in 2000. In May 2005, 4,681 inhabitants were counted.

Infrastructure
All together, Rattelsdorf has four breweries: the Schwanenbräu in Ebing, the Brauerei Endres in Höfen, the Sonnenbräu in Mürsbach and the Brauerei Fischer in Freudeneck (the smallest place in Bamberg district that has a brewery). In all three brewery inns, one can enjoy Franconian beer and bread specialities.

Also, in Medlitz there was the Brauerei Schwarzer Adler until 1986 and until 2002, Mürsbach also had the Brauerei Feiler.

Politics
The mayor is Bruno Kellner (Vereinigtes Umland). The community council is made up of 16 members, shown here according to party affiliation:
Ebinger Liste 4 seats
CSU 4 seats
SPD 3 seats
Christliche-Wähler-Union 2 seats
Vereinigtes Umland 2 seats
Christlich-Bürgerliche-Wählergruppe 1 seat

In 1999, municipal tax revenue, converted to euros, amounted to €1,642,000 of which business taxes (net) amounted to €195,000.

Coat of arms
Rattelsdorf's coat of arms might heraldically be described thus: Argent on ground vert a church gules with roof and cupola azure, the latter surmounted by a Latin cross Or, before the church a pine tree vert, above the church and sinister, an arm clad sable, the hand holding a Latin cross sable.

Economy and infrastructure
According to official statistics, there were 318 workers on the social welfare contribution rolls working in producing businesses, and in trade and transport none. In other areas, 1,673 workers on the social welfare contribution rolls worked from home. In processing businesses there was one business, and in construction there were seven. Furthermore, in 1999, there were 108 agricultural operations with a working area of 1 729 ha, of which 1 294 ha was cropland and 434 ha was meadowland.

Transport
Through the municipal area runs Bundesstraße 4. Being discussed at one time was a local airport to be built on a district plain north of Rattelsdorf. Plans were, however, dropped owing to citizens’ protests.

Education
In 1999 the following institutions existed in Rattelsdorf:
Kindergartens: 175 places with 153 children
Elementary schools: 1 with 17 teachers and 367 pupils

References

External links
 Portrait of Rattelsdorf
  

Bamberg (district)